The Revista de la Asociación Geológica Argentina is an open access peer-reviewed scientific journal published by the Asociación Geológica Argentina. The journal is released under a CC-BY-NC 2.5 license.

See also 
 Andean Geology
 Boletín de Geología

References 

Geology journals
Publications with year of establishment missing
Geology of South America
Multilingual journals
Academic journals published by learned and professional societies of Argentina
Open access journals
Creative Commons-licensed journals
Irregular journals